The Armenian Marder is a breed of rabbit native to Armenia. It is principally raised for meat.

History
The breed was established in 1940. It is the result of crossbreeding the Chinchilla rabbit, the Himalayan rabbit, and native rabbit breeds.

Characteristics
The average litter size is 7-8 kittens.

References

Rabbit breeds
Animal breeds originating in Armenia